Sid Roth's It's Supernatural! is a talk show which televangelist Sid Roth hosts in order to promote the supernatural as it relates to Christianity. The show is widely broadcast on Christian television networks in the United States and it is also widely broadcast on various international networks.

History
Sydney Abraham Rothbaum (born September 7, 1940) is an American talk show host and author. According to Roth, he was raised Jewish but, at age 32, after dabbling in New Age philosophy for several years, he became a "born again" believer after a co-worker convinced him that Jesus is indeed the promised Messiah of the Jews.

Roth launched his nationwide radio broadcast Messianic Vision in 1977. In 1996, he graduated to television as Sid Roth's It's Supernatural! began airing. In late 2013, Roth's ministry started ISN (It's Supernatural! Network), a full-time online network that streams episodes of Sid Roth's It's Supernatural! and other content produced by the ministry and its partners for free.

Format and guests
Each week, Roth interviews people who have experienced miracles and personal encounters with God.
Some of the guests who have been interviewed on Sid Roth's It's Supernatural! include:
Tommy O'Dell, the grandson of legendary evangelist TL Osborn
Jonathan Cahn, author of The Harbinger
Bill Johnson, of Bethel Church
Robin Bullock
John Waller, Christian singer-songwriter known for writing the theme song from the film Fireproof
Guillermo Maldonado, senior pastor of El Rey Jesús
Misty Edwards, a contemporary Christian musician from the International House of Prayer
John Paul Jackson, the founder of Streams Ministries International
Walid Shoebat, a Palestinian-American Baptist and lecturer
Hank Kunneman, the host of New Level with Hank & Brenda Kunneman
Brenda Kunneman, the host of New Level with Hank & Brenda Kunneman

References

External links

Television series about Christianity
Discovery Channel original programming
1996 American television series debuts
2007 American television series endings
Messianic Judaism